WSLI is a radio station which serves the Greater Grand Rapids, Michigan, area. The main broadcast frequency is 1480 kHz, which is licensed to Kentwood, Michigan, a Grand Rapids suburb. It broadcasts Smile FM's contemporary Christian music format.

History
1480 kHz went on the air as commercial station WMAX. By the late 1950s and early 1960s, it was the leading Top 40 music station in Grand Rapids. Afterward, the station played mostly middle of the road and adult contemporary music (and briefly used the WAFT calls for a time in the late 1960s/early 1970s), although WMAX did briefly return to a Top 40-style presentation from about 1972 to 1975 as "GOOD MAX MUSIC 1480." The station dropped its music format in January 1976 for a news/talk format. WMAX NewsRadio 1480 operated as a locally produced all-news radio format from 1976 to 1984, with a staff of 11 reporters. Later, the station dropped the news/talk format for gospel, then contemporary Christian music. For many years, WMAX was the Grand Rapids radio home for Detroit Red Wings hockey. WMAX changed transmitter locations (adding a directional night-time signal) and was reassigned from Grand Rapids to Kentwood in 1984.

The station went silent until July 4, 1991, when it became branded as "All-American NewsTalk 1480 WMAX." The AM station operated out of the Witte Travel Building at 3250 28th Street S.E., near Shaffer Avenue. The station simulcasted the cable-TV network audio signal of the CNN Headline News Network (later, just 'HLN'). At the :24 and :54 marks of each hour during morning drive, noon hour and afternoon drive, 1480 WMAX would cut in with a six-minute locally produced newscast during morning and afternoon drives, before resuming the simulcast at the top or bottom of the hour. Dave Stanley was the program director and James Gemmell was the news director. The owners sold the station in early 1992 to Grand Valley State University. Grand Valley returned it to the air as WGVU on May 22, 1992.

Since returning to the air, it served as a public broadcaster and was a National Public Radio affiliate, with NPR News on the hour (although the station did not air NPR long-form news programming such as Morning Edition and All Things Considered, which were dropped from the schedule with the format change from news/talk to oldies). In 1998, Grand Valley took control of WGVS 850 in Muskegon and converted it into a simulcast of WGVU. Formerly, the station broadcast in AM stereo for years before converting to the newer HD Radio format; WTKG is the only other AM station in the area with an HD signal.

On August 27, 2009, WGVU and WGVS flipped to the oldies format—a first for a public radio station. The station's playlist encompasses hits from the mid-1950s through the mid-1970s and features many seldom-heard songs not typically played on commercial oldies stations, including some titles by local Michigan artists. Big band, traditional pop, and easy listening songs from the 1940s through the '70s were featured on Sunday mornings during the Sunday Morning Standards program. Also airing on Sundays was the West Michigan Top 40 show, which counted down the songs on a historic local record chart from a given date.

Victor Lundberg, a newscaster at WMAX 1480, had a Top 10 hit on the Billboard Hot 100 in 1967 with a spoken-word piece titled "An Open Letter to My Teenage Son." The WMAX calls were originally granted for a station in Ann Arbor in 1922, and now belong to a Catholic-formatted AM station in Bay City, Michigan (in addition, 96.1 FM licensed to Holland, Michigan and serving the Grand Rapids market operates as WMAX-FM, but it has no relationship to 1480 AM).

The 1480 AM towers are located at Kalamazoo Avenue and M-6.

In late 2021, Grand Valley State University announced that it would end the "Real Oldies" format and shut down WGVU and WGVS on January 7, 2022. WGVU-TV and WGVU-FM were not affected by the shutdown of the AM stations. The university originally planned to return the AM stations' licenses to the Federal Communications Commission (FCC) and sell their transmitter sites. On October 6, 2022, it was announced that Smile FM, a network of Christian radio stations in Michigan, had filed a $60,000 deal to purchase WGVU from Grand Valley State University. The purchase was consummated on December 7, 2022, at which point the station changed its call sign to WSLI.

References

Sources
James Gemmell, 1480 WMAX News Director, 1991. "The former WMAX became "All-American NewsTalk 1480 WMAX" in June 1991, going on-air July 4, 1991 - a day when President George H.W. Bush was visiting Grand Rapids.. We ran a simulcast of CNN Headline News' 24/7 all-news format, cutting away from the entertainment portions at the :24 and :54 marks past each hour weekdays, inserting local news/wx/tx/sports in those time-slots. Dave Stanley was the Program Director, and Greg Chandler, Terry DeBoer and Darren Taylor were some of our reporters. Mary Ogle was another person on-staff. The owners later sold the station (1480 AM) to Grand Valley State".

External links

FCC History Cards for WSLI

SLI (AM)
Contemporary Christian radio stations in the United States
Kent County, Michigan
Radio stations established in 1955
1955 establishments in Michigan